Applied Radiation and Isotopes is a peer-reviewed scientific journal published by Elsevier. It was established in 1993 and its scope covers applications of ionizing radiation and radionuclides.

The current editors-in-chief are Richard P. Hugtenburg (Swansea University) and Denis Bergeron (National Institute of Standards and Technology).

Abstracting and indexing
Applied Radiation and Isotopes is indexed in:

Chemical Abstracts Service - CASSI
PubMed
Web of Science

It has a 2020 impact factor of 1.513, according to the Journal Citation Reports.

Former titles history
The history of the journal is as follows: 
The International Journal of Applied Radiation and Isotopes (1956-1985)
International Journal of Radiation Applications and Instrumentation. Part A. Applied Radiation and Isotopes (1986-1992)
Applied Radiation and Isotopes (1992–present)

Notes

External links

References

Physics journals
Elsevier academic journals
English-language journals
Monthly journals
Publications established in 1993